Iniaheide is a hamlet in Tytsjerksteradiel in the province of Friesland, the Netherlands.

Iniaheide is not a statistical entity, and the postal authorities have placed it under Garyp. There are no place name signs. It consists of about 10 houses.

References

Tytsjerksteradiel
Populated places in Friesland